The 2004 WNBA Season was the Women's National Basketball Association's eighth season. The league had one fewer team than in 2003 as the Cleveland Rockers folded after the 2003 season.  The season ended with the Seattle Storm winning their first WNBA Championship, as their head coach Anne Donovan became the first female coach to win a WNBA championship.

Regular season standings
Eastern Conference

Western Conference

Season award winners

Playoffs

Coaches

Eastern Conference
Charlotte Sting: Trudi Lacey and Tyrone Bogues
Connecticut Sun: Mike Thibault
Detroit Shock: Bill Laimbeer
Indiana Fever: Brian Winters
New York Liberty: Richie Adubato and Pat Coyle
Washington Mystics: Michael Adams

Western Conference
Houston Comets: Van Chancellor
Los Angeles Sparks: Michael Cooper, Karleen Thompson and Ryan Weisenberg
Minnesota Lynx: Suzie McConnell Serio
Phoenix Mercury: Carrie Graf
Sacramento Monarchs: John Whisenant
San Antonio Silver Stars: Dee Brown and Shell Dailey
Seattle Storm: Anne Donovan

External links
2004 WNBA Final Standings
2004 WNBA Award Winners
2004 WNBA Playoffs

 
2004 in American women's basketball
2004–05 in American basketball by league
2003–04 in American basketball by league
Women's National Basketball Association seasons